This is a list of compositions by Pierre Rode.

With opus number 
 Six duos for two violins, Op. 1
 Violin Concerto No. 1 in D minor, Op. 3
 Violin Concerto No. 2 in E major, Op. 4
 Violin Concerto No. 3 in G minor, Op. 5
 Violin Concerto No. 4 in A major, Op. 6
 Violin Concerto No. 5 in D major, Op. 7
 Violin Concerto No. 6 in B-flat major, Op. 8
 Violin Concerto No. 7 in A minor, Op. 9
 Air Varié for violin solo and string trio, Op. 10
 String Quartet No. 1 in E-flat major, Op. 11
 Violin Concerto No. 8 in E minor, Op. 13
 Andante varié, Op. 16
 Violin Concerto No. 9 in C major, Op. 17
 String Quartet No. 4 in G major, Op. 18
 Violin Concerto No. 10 in B minor, Op. 19
 Violin Concerto No. 11 in D major, Op. 23
 Violin Concerto No. 12 in E major, Op. 27
 Violin Concerto No. 13 in F-sharp minor / A major, Op. posth.

Without opus number 
 24 Caprices for Violin
 12 Etudes for Violin
 Exercises pour le Violon
 Thème Varié No. 4
 Polonaise for Guitar, Flute or Violin
 Variations on Nel cor più non mi sento from Paisiello's La molinara (for Violin and Orchestra)
 Introduction et variations brillantes, "Air tyrolien" (for Violin and Orchestra)

Notes 

Rode